Open Your Heart may refer to:

 Open Your Heart (talk show), a 2016 Algerian reality television talk show airing on Echourouk TV

Music
 Open Your Heart (album), a 2012 album by The Men

Songs
 "Open Your Heart" (Madonna song), 1986
 "Open Your Heart" (M People song)
 "Open Your Heart" (Europe song), 1984/1988
 "Open Your Heart" (Birgitta song), the Icelandic entry for the Eurovision Song Contest 2003, by Birgitta Haukdal
 "Open Your Heart" (The Human League song), 1981
 "Open Your Heart" (Lavender Diamond song)
 "Open Your Heart", the theme for the video game Sonic Adventure, by Crush 40
 "Open Your Heart", a song by Westlife from Westlife
 "Open Your Heart", a song by CB Milton from the album It's My Loving Thing
 "Open Your Heart", a song from the soundtrack of the anime .hack//Sign
 "Open Your Heart", a song by Anggun from Open Hearts
 "Open Your Heart", a song by Kim Kay
 "Öppna din dörr", 2016 Jill Johnson version in English